Sally Field (born November 6, 1946) is an American actress and director. She is the recipient of various accolades, including two Academy Awards, three Primetime Emmy Awards, two Golden Globe Awards, and a Screen Actors Guild Award, and she has been nominated for a Tony Award and two BAFTA Awards.

Field began her professional career on television, starring in the short-lived comedies Gidget (1965–1966), The Flying Nun (1967–1970), and The Girl with Something Extra (1973–1974). In 1976, she garnered critical acclaim for her performance in the miniseries Sybil, for which she received the Primetime Emmy Award for Outstanding Lead Actress in a Limited Series or Movie. Her film debut was as an extra in Moon Pilot (1962), but it escalated during the 1970s with starring roles including Stay Hungry (1976), Smokey and the Bandit (1977), Heroes (1977), The End (1978), and Hooper (1978). Her career further expanded during the 1980s, receiving the Academy Award for Best Actress for both Norma Rae (1979) and Places in the Heart (1984), and she appeared in Smokey and the Bandit II (1980), Absence of Malice (1981), Kiss Me Goodbye (1982), Murphy's Romance (1985), Steel Magnolias (1989), Mrs. Doubtfire (1993), and Forrest Gump (1994).

In the 2000s, she returned to television with a recurring role on the NBC medical drama ER, for which she won the Primetime Emmy Award for Outstanding Guest Actress in a Drama Series in 2001 and the following year made her stage debut with Edward Albee's The Goat, or Who Is Sylvia?. From 2006 to 2011, she portrayed Nora Walker on the ABC television drama Brothers & Sisters, for which she received the Primetime Emmy Award for Outstanding Lead Actress in a Drama Series in 2007. She starred as Mary Todd Lincoln in Lincoln (2012), for which she received a nomination for the Academy Award for Best Supporting Actress, and she portrayed Aunt May in The Amazing Spider-Man (2012) and its 2014 sequel, with the first being her highest grossing release. In 2015, she portrayed the title character in Hello, My Name Is Doris, for which she was nominated for the Critics' Choice Movie Award for Best Actress in a Comedy. In 2017, she returned to the stage after an absence of 15 years with the revival of Tennessee Williams' The Glass Menagerie for which she received a nomination for the Tony Award for Best Actress in a Play.

As a director, Field is known for the television film The Christmas Tree (1996), an episode of the 1998 HBO miniseries From the Earth to the Moon, and the feature film Beautiful (2000). In 2014, she was presented with a star on the Hollywood Walk of Fame and in 2019 received the Kennedy Center Honors.

Filmography

Film

Television

Stage

Books

Discography

Singles
"Felicidad" (Billboard No. 94, Cashbox No. 91) / "Find Yourself a Rainbow" – Colgems 1008 – August 1967 
"Follow the Star" (Both sides, promo only) – Colgems 107 – December 1967
"Golden Days" / "You're a Grand Old Flag" – Colgems 1014 – January 1968
"Gonna Build a Mountain" / "Months of the Year" (also features Flying Nun stars Madeleine Sherwood and Marge Redmond) – Colgems 1030 – September 1968

Album
Star of The Flying Nun—Colgems COM-106 (Mono) / COS-106 (Stereo) – Billboard No. 172, December 1967

References

External links
Sally Field at the Internet Movie Database
Sally Field at the Internet Broadway Database

Actress filmographies
American filmographies